The following radio stations broadcast on FM frequency 107.1 MHz:

Argentina
 Astral in Capilla del Monte, Córdoba
 Azul in Río Primero, Córdoba
 City in Jujuy
 Cronos in Sastre, Santa Fe
 De La Paz in San Juan
 Disco in Esquel, Chubut
 Esperanza in Maquinista Savio, Buenos Aires
 GD Radio in Puán, Buenos Aires
 Los ángeles in Castelli, Chaco
 La Red Corrientes in Corrientes
 La voz de la amistad in General Cabrera, Córdoba
 Meridiano in Rosario, Santa Fe
 Patagonia in Realicó, La Pampa
 Plaza in Plaza Huincul, Neuquén
 Radio María in San Rafael, Mendoza
 Shalom in Mendoza
 Universal in Buenos Aires

Australia
 2AAA in Wagga Wagga, New South Wales
 2KY in Coffs Harbour, New South Wales
 2KY in Eden, New South Wales
 5SSA in Adelaide, South Australia
 Triple J in Ballarat, Victoria

Canada (Channel 296)
 CBIC-FM in Chéticamp, Nova Scotia
 CBSI-FM-21 in Blanc-Sablon, Quebec
 CFEQ-FM in Winnipeg, Manitoba
 CFNL-FM in Sorrento, British Columbia
 CFNO-FM-2 in Hornepayne, Ontario
 CFNO-FM-5 in Longlac, Ontario
 CFNO-FM-7 in Nakina, Ontario
 CFPB-FM in Kugaaruk, Nunavut
 CFSM-FM-2 in Sparwood, British Columbia
 CHFL-FM in Fort Liard, Northwest Territories
 CHNC-FM in New-Carlisle, Quebec
 CIBM-FM in Riviere-du-Loup, Quebec
 CILQ-FM in Toronto, Ontario
 CISQ-FM in Squamish, British Columbia
 CJCR-FM in Clyde River, Nunavut
 CJFI-FM in Moose Factory, Ontario
 CJHQ-FM in Nakusp, British Columbia
 CJIS-FM in Truro, Nova Scotia
 CJLP-FM in Disraeli, Quebec
 CJME-2-FM in Gravelbourg, Saskatchewan
 CJNW-FM in Edmonton, Alberta
 CJTN-FM in Quinte West, Ontario
 CJWA-FM in Wawa, Ontario
 CKAB-FM in Arctic Bay, Nunavut
 CKQC-FM in Abbotsford, British Columbia
 CKUA-FM-9 in Whitecourt, Alberta
 VF2021 in Kakisa, Northwest Territories
 VF2417 in Paulatuk, Northwest Territories
 VOAR-13-FM in Bridgewater, Nova Scotia

China 
 China Huayi Broadcast in Fuzhou and Putian
 CNR Business Radio in Chifeng and Guang'an
 CNR Music Radio in Xishuangbanna
 CNR The Voice of China in Yonghou
 CRI News Radio in Guangzhou

Israel
 Galgalatz in Jerusalem

Malaysia
 Kelantan FM in Eastern Kelantan
 Nasional FM in Kuantan, Pahang and Taiping, Perak
 Radio Klasik in Miri, Sarawak
Suria in Johor Bahru, Johor and Singapore

Mexico
 XHACN-FM in León, Guanajuato
 XHCGJ-FM in Ciudad Guzmán, Jalisco
 XHCLO-FM in Monclova, Coahuila
 XHDY-FM in Ciudad Morelos, Baja California
 XHETA-FM in Zitácuaro, Michoacán
 XHHTY-FM in Martínez de la Torre, Veracruz
 XHJAQ-FM in Jalpan de Serra, Querétaro
 XHPNS-FM in Piedras Negras, Coahuila
 XHSBE-FM in San Andrés Cholula, Puebla
XHSCDW-FM in Arcelia, Guerrero
XHSCFD-FM in Amatlán De Los Reyes-Cordoba, Veracruz
XHTGAN-FM in Tangancícuaro, Michoacán
 XHVTH-FM in Matamoros, Tamaulipas

New Zealand
Various low-power stations up to 1 watt

Philippines
DZLL-FM in Baguio City
DYEN in Bacolod City
DXLS in Iligan City

Taiwan 
 Transfers China Huayi Broadcast in Matsu

United Kingdom
Raidió Fáilte in Belfast, Northern Ireland
Capital Mid-Counties in Rugby, Warwickshire
Capital Xtra in London, England

United States (Channel 296)
 KARX in Canyon, Texas
 KAUM in Colorado City, Texas
 KBHI in Miner, Missouri
 KBMV-FM in Birch Tree, Missouri
 KBPM-LP in Mesquite, Texas
 KCGW-LP in Edgar, Nebraska
 KCNY in Greenbrier, Arkansas
 KCWR in Bakersfield, California
 KDBX in Clear Lake, South Dakota
 KDRS-FM in Paragould, Arkansas
 KDSN-FM in Denison, Iowa
 KEGH in Woodruff, Utah
 KESR in Shasta Lake City, California
 KESS-FM in Benbrook, Texas
 KFCO in Bennett, Colorado
 KFNV-FM in Ferriday, Louisiana
 KHAV in Sabinal, Texas
 KHIT-FM in Madera, California
 KIPC-LP in Pendleton, Oregon
 KIYQ-LP in Las Vegas, Nevada
 KJML in Columbus, Kansas
 KKEQ in Fosston, Minnesota
 KLJH in Bayfield, Colorado
 KLJX-LP in Flagstaff, Arizona
 KLMZ in Leadwood, Missouri
 KLVU in Sweet Home, Oregon
 KLZT in Bastrop, Texas
 KMDS in Las Vegas, New Mexico
 KMGK in Glenwood, Minnesota
 KNID (FM) in North Enid, Oklahoma
 KNKK in Needles, California
 KYFV in Armijo, New Mexico
 KNWI in Osceola, Iowa
 KOFR-LP in Lander, Wyoming
 KOGD-LP in Shawnee, Oklahoma
 KOGM in Opelousas, Louisiana
 KOUJ-LP in Norman, Oklahoma
 KOYO-LP in Oroville, California
 KPKL in Spokane, Washington
 KPTG-LP in Adelanto, California
 KPVW in Aspen, Colorado
 KQEO in Idaho Falls, Idaho
 KQIP-LP in Chico, California
 KRQN in Vinton, Iowa
 KRQT in Castle Rock, Washington
 KRVA-FM in Campbell, Texas
 KRXB in Beeville, Texas
 KSES-FM in Seaside, California
 KSFT-FM in South Sioux City, Nebraska
 KSIL in Rincon, New Mexico
 KSRT in Cloverdale, California
 KSSC in Ventura, California
 KSSD in Fallbrook, California
 KSSE in Arcadia, California
 KTFS-FM in Texarkana, Arkansas
 KTHI in Caldwell, Idaho
 KTHS-FM in Berryville, Arkansas
 KTMY in Coon Rapids, Minnesota
 KTUM in Tatum, New Mexico
 KVSG-LP in Twisp, Washington
 KVVA-FM in Apache Junction, Arizona
 KWHO in Lovell, Wyoming
 KWLV in Many, Louisiana
 KXHT in Marion, Arkansas
 KYEB-LP in Garland, Texas
 KYNZ in Lone Grove, Oklahoma
 WAFG-LP in Pompano Beach, Florida
 WAOA-FM in Melbourne, Florida
 WAVX-LP in Ormond Beach, Florida
 WBYP in Belzoni, Mississippi
 WCBC-FM in Keyser, West Virginia
 WCHG in Hot Springs, Virginia
 WCKC in Cadillac, Michigan
 WCKT in Lehigh Acres, Florida
 WCXP-LP in Chicago, Illinois
 WDOH in Delphos, Ohio
 WEAI (FM) in Lynnville, Illinois
 WEDJ in Danville, Indiana
 WEJP-LP in Wheeling, West Virginia
 WERZ in Exeter, New Hampshire
 WEVC in Gorham, New Hampshire
 WFHN in Fairhaven, Massachusetts
 WFON in Fond du Lac, Wisconsin
 WFXC in Durham, North Carolina
 WFXM in Gordon, Georgia
 WGMY in Thomasville, Georgia
 WHFV in Shenandoah, Virginia
 WHJB in Greensburg, Pennsylvania
 WHMD in Hammond, Louisiana
 WIRO in Ironton, Ohio
 WIRX in Saint Joseph, Michigan
 WITB-LP in Benton, Kentucky
 WJPS in Boonville, Indiana
 WJYD in Circleville, Ohio
 WKBE in Corinth, New York
 WKCB-FM in Hindman, Kentucky
 WKFS in Milford, Ohio
 WKRV in Vandalia, Illinois
 WKTW-LP in Lenhartsville, Pennsylvania
 WLAI in Danville, Kentucky
 WLBI-LP in Tomahawk, Wisconsin
 WLGF in Gulfport, Mississippi
 WLIH in Whitneyville, Pennsylvania
 WLIR-FM in Hampton Bays, New York
 WLJZ-LP in Salisbury, North Carolina
 WLNU-LP in Lenoir City, Tennessee
 WLSM-FM in Louisville, Mississippi
 WLVX in Greenville, Pennsylvania
 WLVZ in Collins, Mississippi
 WMNB-LP in North Adams, Massachusetts
 WNUS in Belpre, Ohio
 WOCO-FM in Oconto, Wisconsin
 WPGU in Urbana, Illinois
 WPSK-FM in Pulaski, Virginia
 WPVL-FM in Platteville, Wisconsin
 WQJU in Mifflintown, Pennsylvania
 WQKL in Ann Arbor, Michigan
 WRFK (FM) in Barre, Vermont
 WRFN-LP in Pasquo, Tennessee
 WRHM in Lancaster, South Carolina
 WRXZ in Briarcliff Acres, South Carolina
 WSAQ in Port Huron, Michigan
 WSGT in Patterson, Georgia
 WSPY-FM in Plano, Illinois
 WTDK in Federalsburg, Maryland
 WTJN-LP in Troy, Ohio
 WTKF in Atlantic, North Carolina
 WTLZ in Saginaw, Michigan
 WTSH-FM in Rockmart, Georgia
 WTTX-FM in Appomattox, Virginia
 WUHU in Smiths Grove, Kentucky
 WURN-FM in Key Largo, Florida
 WWFK in Dannemora, New York
 WWYY in Belvidere, New Jersey
 WWZY in Long Branch, New Jersey
 WXPK in Briarcliff Manor, New York
 WYFA in Waynesboro, Georgia
 WZLF in Bellows Falls, Vermont
 WZVN (FM) in Lowell, Indiana

References

Lists of radio stations by frequency